The Museum of Contemporary Art Ahvaz (MCAA) was founded in 2005 on the eastern bank of the Karoon River in Ahvaz, Iran. The museum opened in 2010.

The building housing the Museum of Contemporary Art of Ahvaz features 2 stories and 5 galleries.

The museum includes works of art by famous Iranian and international artists focusing on contemporary art from Iran in particular and all around the world in general. Its collections include contemporary paintings, sculptures, photographs, works on paper and more.

The museum hosts a variety of programs such as several international exhibitions and also art fairs of the famous Iranian and international artists.

References

External links
 Museum of Contemporary Art Ahvaz - official site

Art museums and galleries in Iran
Ahvaz
Contemporary art galleries in Iran
Museums in Iran